Orenaia trivialis is a moth in the family Crambidae. It was described by William Barnes and James Halliday McDunnough in 1914. It is found in North America, where it has been recorded from Colorado and the Yukon Territory.

References

Evergestinae
Moths described in 1914